Abbasabad (also Romanized as ‘Abbāsābād) is a village in Qaleh-ye Mozaffari Rural District, in the Central District of Selseleh County, Lorestan Province, Iran. At the 2006 census, its population was 318, in 59 families.

References 

Towns and villages in Selseleh County